Lucio Chua Tan Sr. (born July 17, 1934) is a Filipino business magnate, investor, and philanthropist. He presides over the Filipino conglomerate company LT Group, Inc., a company with extensive business interests in sports, banking, airline, liquor, tobacco, real estate, beverages, and education. As of September 2021, his net worth is estimated at US$1.9 billion.

Early years
Tan was born in Amoy (now Xiamen), Fujian, China. His parents moved to Cebu in the Philippines when he was a child. He was said to have gone to school on barefoot and first worked as a stevedore who tied cargo with ropes made from abaca He earned a bachelor's degree in Chemical Engineering from the Far Eastern University in Manila.  Forbes states that while in college,  Tan "worked as a janitor at a tobacco factory" where he "mopped floors to pay for school."

Philanthropy
Though the companies of Lucio Tan Group has been involved in various social responsible programs, Tan has benevolent personal philanthropy works, particularly in the academic sector. Notable of which is his ownership stake with the University of the East, resulting for the erection of the nine-storey Dr. Lucio C. Tan Building on the university's Caloocan City campus. Tan also gave a grant as an endowment for the development of  Central Philippine University Institute of HRM and Tourism in Jaro, Iloilo City, which in return, was renamed in his honor as the Dr. Lucio C. Tan College of Hospitality Management, the first college/school in his namesake outside Manila. A building which houses the said college is also named after him on the CPU's main campus, the Lucio C. Tan Building.

Business interests

 LT Group, Inc.
 Asia Brewery, Inc. 
 Tanduay Distillers, Inc.
 Absolut Distillers, Inc.
 Asian Alcohol Corporation
 Fortune Tobacco Corporation 
 PMFTC, Inc. – 50% ownership by FTC
 Eton Properties Philippines, Inc.
 Philippine National Bank - (merger of Philippine National Bank and Allied Banking Corporation)
 Victorias Milling Company, Inc. – minority interest and management control

 Philippine Airlines
 PAL Express
 MacroAsia Corporation
 Lufthansa Technik Philippines - 51% ownership by Lufthansa Technik AG, 49% ownership by MacroAsia, 
 MacroAsia Airport Services Corporation
 MacroAsia Catering Services - 67% ownership by MacroAsia, 33% ownership by SATS Ltd
 MacroAsia Properties Development Corporation
 MacroAsia Air Taxi Services
 MacroAsia Mining Corporation
 Cebu Pacific Catering Services Inc.

Others:
 Alliedbankers Insurance Corporation
 Himmel Industries, Inc.
 Century Park Hotel
 Grandspan Development Corporation
 Lucky Travel Corporation
 Foremost Farms, Inc. 
 Pan Asia Securities (stock brokerage firm)
 The Charter House (hotel)
 University of the East
 Tan Yan Kee Foundation

Controversies
In 1997, Forbes, in an article entitled "A report card on Asia", complained about the "considerable corruption still prevalent" in the Philippines, bolstering that claim by citing how Tan "single-handedly held up a tax reform intended to remove special privileges for local tobacco and beer producers."

In 1998, Forbes reported that Tan was spending his free time "[j]ousting with the government over charges of tax evasion" and with Philippine Airlines "shareholders who tried to block his bid for the airline."

According to the January–March 1999 edition of the Philippine Center for Investigative Journalism, Solita "Mareng Winnie" Monsod, an economics professor at the University of the Philippines and former Economic Planning Secretary, was quoted as saying that "Lucio Tan is a role model for the worst kind of conduct as far as our national objectives are concerned. He signals that you can evade taxes and get away with it, pay the courts and get the judges to decide in your favour, get good lawyers and delay your cases. The messages that are given by the kind of treatment that he gets from the Government are the antithesis of what we need for sustainable development: an even playing field and Government intervention of the right kind." [3]

The Presidential Commission on Good Government ("PCGG") originally filed a case against Tan in July 1987, and has since amended it twice, the last time being on September 5, 1991. According to the PCGG, the state is entitled to PHP 50 billion in damages and PHP 1 billion in legal expenses.[4] In addition, the state was seeking to recover 60% of Tan's holdings in companies that Tan held in trust for the former president Marcos – such as Fortune Tobacco, Asia Brewery, Allied Banking Corporation, Foremost Farms, Himmel Industries, Grandspan Development Corp., Silangan Holdings, Dominium Realty and Construction Corp., and Shareholdings Inc. – as the PCGG alleges that they were illegally acquired by Marcos using government funds.

After filing the case in July 1987, the PCGG seized control of Tan's companies, continuing to do so until 2006 when the anti-graft court Sandiganbayan nullified the writs of sequestration on Allied Banking Corp., Fortune Tobacco, Foremost Farms and Shareholdings Inc. The court ruled the writs had no basis as there was no prima facie proof that any of Tan's assets were obtained illegally.

The PCGG soon afterwards filed a petition to the Supreme Court. On December 7, 2007, the Supreme Court affirmed the decision of the anti-graft court. The Supreme Court found no proof that Tan, his family, or his various businesses took undue advantage of their relationship with former President Marcos. Finding no factual basis for the sequestration of the stocks, the Supreme Court denied the PCGG's petition, according to a court statement.

In an April 29, 2009, letter filed at the anti-graft court, the PCGG announced that it is "resting its case" and terminating its presentation of evidence in the PHP 51 billion lawsuit. This, the report said, came as a surprise as government lawyers had earlier insisted in court that they still have several key witnesses, including former First Lady Imelda Marcos.

In 2017, President Rodrigo Duterte accused him of owing the Philippine government around US$600 million in unpaid taxes. After the tycoon was cleared of tax evasion, the national leader vowed to “shut up” about the issue.

References

1934 births
Living people
Businesspeople from Xiamen
Businesspeople from Cebu
Filipino people of Chinese descent
Businesspeople in brewing
Businesspeople in the tobacco industry
Central Philippine University people
Central Philippine University alumni
Chinese emigrants to the Philippines
Drink distillers
Far Eastern University alumni
Filipino bankers
Filipino billionaires
Filipino businesspeople in real estate
Filipino Catholics
Filipino investors
Janitors
Naturalized citizens of the Philippines
Philippine Airlines
Philippine Basketball Association executives